Hüseyin Cengiz (born 25 July 1984) is a Turkish-Dutch former footballer.

Club career
Cengiz played for De Graafschap and Turkish side Yozgatspor, before joining Eerste Divisie club AGOVV in 2006.

He left AGOVV for Turkish second division side Gençlerbirliği Oftaş in the January 2007 transfer window. He then had a loan spell alongside a bunch of other Dutch-Turkish footballers at Yeni Kırşehir.

VB Sports Club
After leaving Turkish football, Hüseyin trained in Holland with De CJV'ers only to sign a professional contract with Maldivian outfit VB Sports Club in 2010.

Cengiz scored his first goal for the club in his first game in the 83rd minute of the game, where VB Sports Club won 8–0 over Thoddoo FC.

Awards and honours

Club
VB Sports Club
Dhivehi League (3): 2009, 2010, 2011
FA Cup (1): 2011
President's Cup (1): 2010
FA Charity Shield (3): 2010, 2011, 2012

Notes
‡ - VB Sports Club name was changed to VB Addu FC in 2012.

References

1984 births
Living people
People from Lochem
Dutch people of Turkish descent
Association football wingers
Turkish footballers
Dutch footballers
De Graafschap players
Yimpaş Yozgatspor footballers
AGOVV Apeldoorn players
Hacettepe S.K. footballers
Kırşehirspor footballers
Dutch expatriate footballers
Expatriate footballers in the Maldives
Expatriate footballers in Lebanon
Dutch expatriate sportspeople in the Maldives
Dutch expatriate sportspeople in Lebanon
Racing Club Beirut players
Lebanese Premier League players
Footballers from Gelderland